Events in the year 1661 in India.

Events
 7 October – Guru Har Krishan becomes the eighth Sikh guru, Guru Ji 
 23 June – Bombay is given to Charles II of England as the marriage portion of Catherine of Portugal.

Births

Deaths
 8 March Guru Har Rai seventh Sikh guru dies (born 1630)

References

 
India
Years of the 17th century in India